VNL may refer to:
 Atomistix Virtual NanoLab
 von Neumann-Landauer, see Reversible computing
 Video Networks Limited (1992–2006), British company acquired by Tiscali in 2006
 Victorian Netball League
 VNL, a numerics library, part of the VXL collection
 For the Netherlands, Dutch political party established by Groep Bontes/Van Klaveren
 Victor Nilsson Lindelöf, Swedish footballer currently playing for Manchester United
 FIVB Volleyball Nations League (Men's) (Women's)